Kampimodromus is a genus of mites in the Phytoseiidae family.

Species
 Kampimodromus aberrans (Oudemans, 1930)
 Kampimodromus adrianae Ferragut & Pena-Estevez, 2003
 Kampimodromus alettae (Ueckermann & Loots, 1985)
 Kampimodromus coryli Meshkov, 1999
 Kampimodromus echii Ferragut & Pena-Estevez, 2003
 Kampimodromus elongatus (Oudemans, 1930)
 Kampimodromus ericinus Ragusa Di Chiara & Tsolakis, 1994
 Kampimodromus hmiminai McMurtry & Bounfour, 1989
 Kampimodromus judaicus (Swirski & Amitai, 1961)
 Kampimodromus keae (Papadoulis & Emmanouel, 1991)
 Kampimodromus langei Wainstein & Arutunjan, 1973
 Kampimodromus molle (Ueckermann & Loots, 1985)
 Kampimodromus ragusai Swirski & Amitai, 1997

References

Phytoseiidae